Brunswick Station may refer to one of the following places:

Australia
 Brunswick railway station, Melbourne
 Fortitude Valley railway station, Brisbane, formerly known as Brunswick Street railway station

United Kingdom
 Brunswick railway station, Liverpool

United States
 Brunswick Maine Street Station, in Brunswick, Maine, United States
 Brunswick Nuclear Generating Station, North Carolina
 Brunswick Station, Maine, a census-designated place
 Naval Air Station Brunswick
 Brunswick station (Maryland), in Brunswick, Maryland, United States